Barnfield is a surname. Notable people with the surname include:

Graham Barnfield (born 1969), British academic and pundit
Kacey Barnfield (born 1988), English actress
Richard Barnfield (1574–1620), English poet
Robert C. Barnfield (1856–1893), English painter